Sergei Popov may refer to:
 Sergey Aleksandrovich Popov (born 1949) Russian politician
 Sergei Igorevich Popov (born 1987), Russian footballer
 Sergei Popov (marathon runner) (1930–1995), Soviet marathon runner
 Sergei Popov (businessman) (born 1971), Russian businessman and billionaire
 Serhiy Popov (born 1971), Ukrainian footballer
 Sergey Popov (rugby union) (born 1982), Russian rugby union player and coach
 Sergei Popov (bioweaponeer), Soviet Union bio-weapons scientist; defector to USA
 Sergey Popov (hurdler) (1929–2018), Soviet Olympic hurdler 
 Sergey Popov (guitarist) (born 1959), Russian musician, guitarist and songwriter